Ardhmëria Basket is an Albanian basketball club based in Tiranë, Albania.

History
Ardhmëria Basket was founded in 2006, initially as a basketball school for the local youth. The club created the senior team in 2015 and in its first competitive season, it won the 2015–16 Albanian Basketball First Division, achieving the promotion to the Albanian Basketball League, the highest level of basketball in the country.

Trophies
Albanian First Division: 1
2015–16

References

Basketball teams in Albania
Sport in Tirana
Basketball teams established in 2006